Antonio Niccolini (21 April 1772 – 8 May 1850) was an Italian architect, scenic designer, and engraver.

Niccolini was born in San Miniato al Tedesco, Tuscany.  He is best known for rebuilding the interior of the Teatro di San Carlo after it burned down in 1816. He was also an active scenographer for the theater. Raffaele del Ponte was one of his pupils. He published a number of treatises on architecture from Pompeii and Herculaneum, including:
Descrizione della gran terma puteolana, volgarmente detta Tempio di Serapide By A. Niccolini (1846) Naples, Stamperia Reale.
Real museo borbonico, Volumes 1 - 15, Museo Nazionale di Napoli, by A. Niccolini.
Views and Restorations of the Monuments of Pompeii, by A. Niccolini.
Quadro in musaico scoperto in Pompei a di 24 ottobre 1831, by A. Niccolini (1832) 
Sul ritratto di Leone X dipinto da Raffaello di Urbino e sulla copia di Andrea del Sarto, by A. Niccolini (1841), Stamperia Reale, Naples.

He died in Naples, aged 78.

References

1772 births
1850 deaths
19th-century Italian architects
Italian scenic designers
Painters from Naples
People from San Miniato
Architects from Tuscany